Shed Brook flows into West Canada Creek by Newport in Herkimer County, New York.

References

Rivers of New York (state)
Rivers of Herkimer County, New York